Bangor Township Schools is a school district headquartered in Bangor Township, Bay County, Michigan, near Bay City.

History
John Glenn High School opened in 1965. In 1997, Bangor Junior High School was renamed to Christa McAuliffe Middle School in keeping with the space theme of the school district.

Schools
Secondary:
 John Glenn High School
 Christa McAuliffe Middle School, formerly Bangor Junior High School (-1997) mascot changed with the school's name from the Bangor Badgers to the Comets

Primary:
 Bangor Central Elementary School
 Bangor Lincoln Elementary School
 Bangor West Central Elementary School

Preschool:
 Bangor North Preschool

Sports
John Glenn High School was a member of the North East Michigan Conference. In 2010 that conference stopped being an all-sports league, which began a search for a new conference. In October 2016, Glenn was admitted as a member of the Saginaw Valley League starting in the 2017–2018 school year.

References

External links
 Bangor Township Schools

School districts in Michigan
Education in Bay County, Michigan